Muḥammad ibn Aḥmad Saffārīnī (1114 AH, 1702/3 AD, Saffarin, Tulkarm – 1188 AH, 1774 AD, Nablus) also written as Muhammad bin Ahmad al-Saffarini Al-Hanbali, was a Palestinian Hanbali cleric, jurist, muhaddith, writer and historian. His full name was Shams al-Din Abu al-Aun Muhammad bin Ahmad bin Salim bin Sulayman al-Saffarini Nablusi.

Biography 
Muhammad ibn Ahmad al-Saffarini was born in Saffarin village of Tulkarm Governorate in 1114 AH / 1701 AD. He completed his education of Qur'an in the village. He also studied the book "Dalīl aṭ-ṭālib li-nail al-maṭālib" of the author Mar'i al-Karmi.

Work 
He was the author of several books in many subjects such as Fiqh, Aqeedah and Tafsir. including:
 Lawāmiʻ al-anwār al-bahīyah wa-sawāṭiʻ al-asrār al-atharīyah.
 Durrah al-muḍīyah fi ʻaqd al-firqah al-mardīyah.
 Sharh Thalathiyat Musnad al-Imam Ahmad
 Kashf Al-Litham Li Sharh Umdat Al-Ahkam
 Natāʼij al-afkār fī sharḥ Ḥadīth Sayyid al-istighfār
 Ghidha ul Albabi Bi Sharh Mandhumatil Aadabi
 Al-Buhur Az-Zakhiratu fi ‘ulum al-Akhira

External links 
 Scholar Of Renown: Muhammad Ibn Ahmad Al-Saffarini

References 

1701 births
1774 deaths
Palestinian Sunni Muslim scholars of Islam
Hanbalis
Atharis
People from Saffarin